Gabriel Churchkitten is the name of a fictional cat, the hero of several children's books written by Margot Austin.

The first of these stories was made into an animated cartoon produced by Famous Studios and released by Paramount Pictures in December 15, 1944 as part of the Noveltoon series. The plot concerns how Gabriel (voiced by Cecil Roy) tries to get Parson Peaseporridge, the church's sleepwalking pastor (voiced by Jackson Beck) to wake up and feed him and his friends Peter the church mouse and Trumpet the dog.

External links
Big Cartoon Database entry 

1944 animated films
1940s American animated films
Series of children's books
Characters in children's literature
1944 films
Paramount Pictures short films
Animated films about cats
American animated short films